David Walsh (born 1959) is a former jockey in Thoroughbred racing in New Zealand.  He is notable for having won the New Zealand jockey's premiership twice and riding over 2,500 winners in New Zealand and overseas.

Racing career

David Walsh was apprenticed to Jim Lalor and had his first race-day start at Riccarton Park Racecourse during New Zealand Cup week in 1974 and his first winner, Three Sevens in December of that year. He rode three other wins in his first season.

Walsh's total of over 2,500 victories in his four decade career includes races in Australia, Japan, Singapore, Malaysia and Mauritius. He has the second highest total of New Zealand winners behind Chris Johnson. Walsh previously held the New Zealand record total having overtaken Lance O'Sullivan's total on 27 April 2014 when he rode Willy Duggan to win at Blenheim. There are only seven jockeys who have ridden 2,000 New Zealand winners: Johnson, Walsh, Lance O'Sullivan, Noel Harris, David Peake, Bill Skelton and Michael Coleman. His most notable win was the 1994 Cox Plate with Solvit.

Walsh retired in 2017.

Notable victories

The following are some of the major races Walsh has won.

See also 
 Thoroughbred racing in New Zealand

References

Living people
1959 births
New Zealand jockeys